Vivo X7 is an Android smartphone developed by Vivo Communication Technology Co. The phone was initially released in June 2016. It has a  display, a 3000 mAh battery, and 13 and 16 MP cameras.

Specifications

Software
Vivo X7 comes with Android 5.1 (Lollipop) operating system.

Hardware
Vivo X7 has a 5.2 in display with a resolution of 1080 x 1920 pixels. It has forward and backward facing cameras with resolutions of 16 and 13 MP, respectively. It is equipped with an Octa-core (4x1.8 GHz Cortex-A72 & 4x1.4 GHz Cortex-A53) CPU and an Adreno 510 GPU.  It has a 3000 mAh battery and a fingerprint sensor.

History
Vivo X7 was announced in June 2016 and released July of the same year. The phone sold at least 250,000 units in just the first day of its release.

See also 
Android
Smartphone

References 

Android (operating system) devices
Vivo smartphones
Mobile phones introduced in 2016
Discontinued smartphones